The England men's national under-16 basketball team is a national basketball team of England, administered by the Basketball England. It represents the country in men's international under-16 basketball competitions.

The team participated 5 times at the FIBA U16 European Championship Division A: in 1973, 1975, 1995, 2012, and 2015. They also won four medals at the FIBA U16 European Championship Division B.

See also
England men's national basketball team
England men's national under-18 basketball team
England women's national under-16 basketball team

References

External links
Archived records of England team participations

Basketball in England
Men's national under-16 basketball teams
Basketball